Gabriel Pinheiro Chagas Filho (born 7 December 1944 in Rio de Janeiro, Brazil) is a Brazilian bridge player. He was the winner of World Team Olympiad in Monte Carlo 1976, Bermuda Bowl in Perth 1989, World Open Pairs Championship in Geneva 1990, as well as Transnational Teams in Paris 2001. He is one of 10 players who achieved the Triple Crown of Bridge.

Tournament record

Wins
 Bermuda Bowl (1) 1989
 World Open Team Olympiad (1) 1976
 World Open Pairs (1) 1990
 World Transnational Open Teams (1) 2001
 North American Bridge Championships (2)
 Reisinger (1) 1992
 Master Mixed Teams (1) 1992
 South American Championships (32)
 Open Teams (28) 1967, 1968, 1969, 1970, 1972, 1973, 1974, 1975, 1977, 1978, 1982, 1983, 1984, 1986, 1987, 1989, 1990, 1991, 1993, 1996, 1997, 1998, 1999, 2000, 2002, 2006, 2007, 2008
 Open Pairs (4) 1984, 1990, 1994, 2006
  Brazilian Championships (16)
 Open Teams (14) 1967, 1968, 1969, 1971, 1981, 1983, 1984, 1987, 1992, 1993, 1997, 2000, 2003, 2008
 Open Pairs (2) 1968, 1978
  Other notable wins:
 IOC Grand Prix (1) 1998
 Cap Gemini Pandata World Top Invitational Pairs (1) 1993
 Cap Gemini World Top Invitational Pairs (1) 1997
 Sunday Times Invitational Pairs (1) 1979
 Sunday Times–Macallan Invitational Pairs (1) 1992

Runner-up
 Bermuda Bowl (1) 2000
 Rosenblum Cup (2) 1978, 1998
 South American Championships (6)
 Open Teams (6) 1966, 1976, 1994, 1995, 2001, 2005
  Brazilian Championships (8)
 Open Teams (5) 1990, 1996, 2002, 2005, 2006
 Open Pairs (3) 1992, 1996, 2002
  Other notable 2nd places:
 IOC Grand Prix (1) 1999
 Cavendish Invitational Teams (1) 1996
 Traditionalists vs. Scientists (1) 1990
 Naturalists vs. Scientists (1) 1992
 Staten Bank World Top Invitational Pairs (2) 1989, 1990
 Sunday Times Invitational Pairs (1) 1978
 Pan American Open Pairs (1) 1992

Suspension
On 20 April 2021, the Federação Brasileira de Bridge (FBB) - the Brazilian Bridge Federation - sanctioned Chagas for cheating while playing bridge online. While few details were presented in the notice of suspension, it was noted that three incidents had been investigated and while Chagas deemed the conclusion unfair, he accepted the inevitable outcome of being found guilty and accepted the FBB's proposed sanctions.

Effective 15 April 2021, Chagas is
 suspended from participating in tournaments promoted by the Brazilian Bridge Federation and its associated clubs for a period of one year,
 is prevented from representing Brazil, nationally or internationally, for a period of one year and
 his titles and ranking points in online tournaments held from March 2020 onwards are revoked.

External links

References

Brazilian contract bridge players
Bermuda Bowl players
1944 births
Living people
Sportspeople from Rio de Janeiro (city)